In mathematics, omega function refers to a function using the Greek letter omega, written ω or Ω.

 (big omega) may refer to:

 The lower bound in Big O notation, meaning that the function  dominates  in some limit
Absolute Infinity

 (omega) may refer to:

 The Wright Omega Function , related to the Lambert W Function
 The Pearson–Cunningham function 